

R01A Decongestants and other nasal preparations for topical use

R01AA Sympathomimetics, plain
R01AA02 Cyclopentamine
R01AA03 Ephedrine
R01AA04 Phenylephrine
R01AA05 Oxymetazoline
R01AA06 Tetryzoline
R01AA07 Xylometazoline
R01AA08 Naphazoline
R01AA09 Tramazoline
R01AA10 Metizoline
R01AA11 Tuaminoheptane
R01AA12 Fenoxazoline
R01AA13 Tymazoline
R01AA14 Epinephrine
R01AA15 Indanazoline

R01AB Sympathomimetics, combinations excluding corticosteroids
R01AB01 Phenylephrine
R01AB02 Naphazoline
R01AB03 Tetryzoline
R01AB05 Ephedrine
R01AB06 Xylometazoline
R01AB07 Oxymetazoline
R01AB08 Tuaminoheptane

R01AC Antiallergic agents, excluding corticosteroids
R01AC01 Cromoglicic acid
R01AC02 Levocabastine
R01AC03 Azelastine
R01AC04 Antazoline
R01AC05 Spaglumic acid
R01AC06 Thonzylamine
R01AC07 Nedocromil
R01AC08 Olopatadine
R01AC51 Cromoglicic acid, combinations

R01AD Corticosteroids
R01AD01 Beclometasone
R01AD02 Prednisolone
R01AD03 Dexamethasone
R01AD04 Flunisolide
R01AD05 Budesonide
R01AD06 Betamethasone
R01AD07 Tixocortol
R01AD08 Fluticasone
R01AD09 Mometasone
R01AD11 Triamcinolone
R01AD12 Fluticasone furoate
R01AD13 Ciclesonide
R01AD52 Prednisolone, combinations
R01AD53 Dexamethasone, combinations
R01AD57 Tixocortol, combinations
R01AD58 Fluticasone, combinations
R01AD59 Mometasone, combinations 
R01AD60 Hydrocortisone, combinations

R01AX Other nasal preparations
R01AX01 Calcium hexamine thiocyanate
R01AX02 Retinol
R01AX03 Ipratropium bromide
R01AX05 Ritiometan
R01AX06 Mupirocin
R01AX07 Hexamidine
R01AX08 Framycetin
R01AX09 Hyaluronic acid
R01AX10 Various
R01AX30 Combinations

R01B Nasal decongestants for systemic use

R01BA Sympathomimetics
R01BA01 Phenylpropanolamine
R01BA02 Pseudoephedrine
R01BA03 Phenylephrine
R01BA51 Phenylpropanolamine, combinations
R01BA52 Pseudoephedrine, combinations
R01BA53 Phenylephrine, combinations

References

R01